Hannah Blythyn MS (born 17 April 1979) is a Welsh politician who serving as Deputy Minister for Social Partnership since 2021. She was previously Deputy Minister for Housing and Local Government from 2018 to 2021. A member of Welsh Labour, she has been the Member of the Senedd (MS) for Delyn since 2016.

Political career
Hannah Blythyn was selected as the Welsh Labour candidate for the Delyn constituency of the Senedd. On 5 May 2016, she was elected a Member of the Senedd; she had received 9,480 of the 23,159 votes cast (40.9%). On 6 May 2021 she retained the seat in the 2021 Senedd election; she received 12,846 votes, 48.1% of the 26,443 votes cast. 

Blythyn is a former co-chair of LGBT Labour.

Personal life
Hannah Blythyn is a lesbian. She became one of the first three openly gay Members of the Welsh Assembly upon her election in 2016. She featured in the 2017 Pinc List of leading Welsh LGBT figures.

References

1979 births
Living people
Welsh Labour members of the Senedd
Female members of the Senedd
Wales MSs 2016–2021
Wales MSs 2021–2026
Place of birth missing (living people)
Lesbian politicians
LGBT government ministers
LGBT members of the Senedd